New Memphis is an unincorporated community in Clinton County, Illinois, United States. New Memphis has a post office with ZIP code 62266.

History
In 1862 a Lutheran church was built in the community. In 1865 the layout of the community was built and people starting, also in 1865 the first store was opened in the community. In 1867 a flour mill was opened in the community attracting more people to the community.

References

Unincorporated communities in Clinton County, Illinois
Unincorporated communities in Illinois